The 2011 Volta a Portugal is a men's road bicycle race held from 4 to 15 August 2011. It is the 73rd edition of the men's stage race to be held, which was established in 1927. A part of the 2010–2011 UCI Europe Tour, it is rated as a 2.1 event.

Schedule

Teams
14 teams are invited to the 2011 Volta a Portugal, but the Italian team Acqua & Sapone remove its inscription in the Volta a Portugal, due to lack of cyclists to participate.  1 team is from the UCI ProTeams, 3 are UCI Professional Continental Teams and 9 are UCI Continental Teams.

Stages

Prologue
4 August 2011 – Fafe to Fafe,  Individual Time Trial (ITT)

Stage 1
5 August 2011 – Trofa to Oliveira do Bairro,

Stage 2
6 August 2011 – Oliveira de Azeméis to Alto da Nossa Sra. da Assunção,

Stage 3
7 August 2011 – Viana do Castelo to Alto da Sra. da Graça,

Stage 4
8 August 2011 – Lamego to Gouveia,

Stage 5
9 August 2011 – Oliveira do Hospital to Viseu,

Stage 6
11 August 2011 – Aveiro to Castelo Branco,

Stage 7
12 August 2011 – Sabugal to Guarda,  (ITT)

Stage 8
13 August 2011 – Seia to Torre,

Stage 9
14 August 2011 – Covilhã to Sertã,

Stage 10
15 August 2011 – Sintra to Lisboa,

Classification leadership

References

Volta a Portugal
Volta a Portugal
2011